Platycypha is a genus of African damselflies in the jewel damselfly family (Chlorocyphidae).

The genus contains the following species:
Platycypha amboniensis  - Montane Dancing-jewel
Platycypha auripes  - Golden Dancing-jewel
Platycypha caligata  - Dancing Jewel
Platycypha eliseva 
Platycypha fitzsimonsi  - Boulder Jewel
Platycypha inyangae 
Platycypha lacustris 
Platycypha picta 
Platycypha pinheyi 
Platycypha rufitibia  - Red-booted Jewel

References

Chlorocyphidae
Zygoptera genera
Taxa named by Frederic Charles Fraser
Taxonomy articles created by Polbot